Igor Marko (1965–2006) was an international speedway rider from the Soviet Union and Ukraine. He rode under the Soviet Union flag until the Dissolution of the Soviet Union.

Speedway career 
Marko won the gold medal at the Individual Speedway Junior European Championship in the 1986 Individual Speedway Junior European Championship.

European final appearances

European Under-21
 1986 -  Rivne, Rivne Speedway  - 1st - 13pts

Death
Marko was killed in a street robbery in Rivne, Ukraine on 16 November 2006.

References 

1965 births
2006 deaths
Russian speedway riders